John Trumbull (1756–1843) was an American painter active during the American Revolutionary War.

John Trumbull may also refer to:
John Trumbull (poet) (1750–1831), a cousin of the painter
John H. Trumbull (1873–1961), American politician, 70th Governor of Connecticut

See also
Jonathan Trumbull (1710–1785), American politician, 16th Governor of Connecticut
John William Trumble (1863–1944), Australian cricketer